"Dance (Pt. 1)" is a song by the British rock band the Rolling Stones. Written by Mick Jagger, Keith Richards, and Ronnie Wood, the song evolved out of a single riff. The song appeared as the opening track on the band's 1980 album Emotional Rescue.

Background
The song is one of the first Rolling Stones tracks to have been co-written by Ronnie Wood, who is credited with coming up with the original riff for the song. Wood said of the song's origins, Dance Pt. 1' was one strong riff where Mick immediately took the bait, literally got up and danced to it, which was the whole idea of the track: it's a catchy riff. That was an example of a song that originated without words, just a groove with various changes, but never a chorus." Featuring a disco influence seen in other Stones songs of the time (such as "Miss You" and "Emotional Rescue") the track featured Santana's Michael Shrieve on percussion and Jamaican musician Max Romeo on backing vocals.

Release and reception
"Dance (Pt. 1)" was released as the first track on Emotional Rescue in June 1980. Although not released as a single, the song reached No. 9 on Billboard's Dance chart. Ultimate Classic Rock ranked the song as the 81st best Rolling Stones song, saying "If you think there was something wrong — as some fans contend — with the Rolling Stones dabbling in dance and disco rhythms as powerfully and capably as they do on ‘Dance (Pt. 1),’ the opening track to their 1980 album ‘Emotional Rescue,’ we’d like to invite you to explain it to us."

Alternate versions
A second part of the song, entitled "If I Was A Dancer (Dance Pt. 2)," appeared on the compilation album Sucking in the Seventies. Wood said of the song's multiple parts, "We did have various alternative mixes going at the time, but I can't really tell the difference between Part I or Part II or Part III. It was just a novelty, the Pt. 1 bit." 

There are major differences, however; Part II has an extended bridge: instead of only saying the chorus of "It's time to get up, get out... get into something new" it also goes into lines such as, "If I were a woman, I would need a new man every night... If I was a movie star, five million dollars would be my price...
If I was a trucker, I'd drive for seven days and seven lonely nights" followed by "if" he were a "hooker" and even "The President."

References

The Rolling Stones songs
1980 songs
Songs written by Jagger–Richards
Song recordings produced by Jagger–Richards
Songs written by Ronnie Wood